Rabitsch is a surname. Notable people with the surname include:

Christoph Rabitsch (born 1996), Austrian footballer
Harald Rabitsch, Austrian luger
Stephan Rabitsch (born 1991), Austrian racing cyclist 
Thomas Rabitsch (born 1956), Austrian keyboardist and record producer